William Bromley may refer to:

 William Bromley (MP for Liverpool), MP for Liverpool
 William Bromley (of Holt Castle) (1656–1707), Whig MP for Worcester and Worcestershire
 William Bromley (speaker) (1663–1732), Speaker of the British House of Commons
 William Bromley (died 1737) (1699–1737), MP for Fowey, Warwick, and Oxford University (son of the above)
 William Throckmorton Bromley (1726–1769), MP for Warwickshire (son of the above)
 William Bromley (artist) (1769–1842), British engraver

See also
 William Bromley-Davenport (disambiguation)